Lil Bitts (born Shivonne Liesl-Anne Churche, 31 October 1984) is a soca musician from Trinidad and Tobago. She is best known for her hits "Bump", "Crush" and "Hold Meh".

Biography

Lil Bitts began singing Social Commentary at the age of nine, leaving Sacred Heart Girls RC School with the title of "Calypso Monarch" in 1996. She played the tenor steel pan with Woodtrin Steel Orchestra (1998-1999) when they won the National Junior Panorama Competition and a finalist in the National Calypso Juniors in 1999.

After taking second place at the Inter Calypso School Competition in 2001, she began the move from Social Commentary to soca music, coming fifth at the National Junior Soca Monarch Competition later that year. Her self-penned song "Esta Fiesta" on the Christmas Riddum won Best Soca Parang of 2005.

"Crush", written by Kernal Roberts, enabled her to make her debut into the International Soca Monarch Competition 2006. She was a finalist in the Groovy Soca category in 2010 with "Careful" penned by her brother, Sherrard Churche.

Lil Bitts, together with Mel (Shivorne Melissa Mitchell), Miki (Tamika Ward-Lewis) and CutieRae (Elena Rachel Rawlins), launched the Making Music to Benefit Charities (M2BC) Foundation in 2009. The Foundation organises fund raisers and hosts various events throughout Trinidad to raise money to purchase instruments for numerous homes and orphanages in Trinidad.

In 2010, Lil Bitts established an entertainment services company, Go 4wd Entertainment. The company aims to serve new and rising young artistes, providing development as well as booking services.

Lil Bitts has performed in Antigua, The Bahamas, Barbados, Canada, Grenada, Guyana, Jamaica, St. Vincent and the United States whilst regularly appearing on stage in Trinidad. She is actively supported by her fan club, known as the Bitts Army.

She is pursuing an associate degree in performing arts at the College of Science, Technology and Applied Arts of Trinidad and Tobago (COSTAATT).

International Soca Monarch and Groovy Soca Monarch Competitions

2011 - Semi finalist Power Soca and Groovy Soca categories.
2012 - Semi finalist Groovy Soca category
2013 - Finalist Power Soca category. Finals held on 8 February 2013.

Discography

Solo
Spin Yuh Towel (2002)
Groove Mih (2002)
Doh Leh Go (2003)
Bump (2005)
Esta Fiesta (2005)
Ah Little Bit (2007)
Hold Meh (2009)
Careful (2010)
Everywhere (2010)
Go Down Low (2011)
Sweetness (2011)
We Own The Night (2011)
Parade of De Bandz (2011)
Mischief (2011)
Ketchin It (2011)
Stormin (2012)
Horner Woman (Free Up Riddim) (2012)
Juk (PM1 Riddim) (2012)
Panorama (2012)
Raise De Dust (2012)
Instruction (2013)

Collaborations
In My Country (featuring Bunji Garlin) (2004)
Somebody (featuring Baron (musician)) (2006)
Crush (featuring Sean Caruth) (2006)
Juicy Bitts (featuring Juicy Jahbami) (2007)
Luv U For Eva (featuring Bunji Garlin) (2007)
Dis Year (featuring Olatunji Yearwood) (2009)
Careful (remix featuring Skinny Fabulous) (2010)

References

External links
21 Questions with Lil Bitts (Trinidad Express, Dec 22, 2011)
A weakness for Sweetness...big tune for Lil Bitts (Guardian Trinidad, Jan 20, 2011)
Lil Bitts on Reverbnation.com
Lil Bitts on Youtube.com
 Lil Bitts on Facebook.com

Living people
1984 births
Soca musicians
21st-century Trinidad and Tobago women singers
21st-century Trinidad and Tobago singers